Davis v. United States, 160 U.S. 469 (1895), is a criminal case establishing that in a federal case, the prosecution bears the burden of proof of sanity if an insanity defense is raised. It is a common law ruling that sets precedent in federal court, but is not a constitutional ruling interpreting the United States Constitution, so does not preclude states from requiring defendants to prove insanity, even to the point of requiring defendants to prove insanity beyond a reasonable doubt, as in Leland v. Oregon (1951).

References

External links
 

1895 in United States case law
United States Supreme Court cases
United States Supreme Court cases of the Fuller Court